The Defeated Victor is a 1958 Italian drama film directed by Paolo Heusch. It was entered into the 9th Berlin International Film Festival.

Cast
 Maurizio Arena as Romolo De Santis
 Giovanna Ralli as Lina
 Tiberio Mitri as Enrico Costantini
 Cathia Caro as Giuditta
 Fosco Giachetti as Doctor boxing
 Alberto Grassi as Menicucci
 Erminio Spalla as Coach 
 Giulio Calì
 Lello Bersani as Speaker television
 Fausto Tozzi

References

External links

1958 films
Italian drama films
1950s Italian-language films
1958 drama films
Italian black-and-white films
Films directed by Paolo Heusch
Films scored by Carlo Rustichelli
1950s Italian films